American rapper Young Buck has released two studio albums, four independent albums, 6 collaborative albums, 32 mixtapes, 20 singles (including seven as a featured artist), and 27 music videos.

Albums

Studio albums

Independent albums

Collaboration albums

Remix albums

Official mixtapes

Collaboration mixtapes

Singles

As lead artist

As featured artist

Other charted songs

Guest appearances

Remixes

Music videos

References 

Hip hop discographies
Discographies of American artists